Mastax striaticeps is a species of beetle in the family Carabidae with restricted distribution in Bangladesh.

References

Mastax striaticeps
Beetles of Asia
Beetles described in 1876